Nanyue Yuan is a Lingnan-style Chinese garden in Guangzhou, China. It is adjacent to its sister garden, Baomo Yuan, and joint tickets are available.

Development 
The site started construction in December 2007, and opened on 28 September 2009. People's Daily reported that the construction costed more than 200 million Yuan.

Features 
The site features landscaped gardens, a lake, Lingnan architecture, various art and antiques. One of the architectural features is a nine-dragon wall made from ceramics. The garden is adjacent to Baomo Yuan but is smaller and covers 100 acres.

Etymology 
Nanyue refers to the Southern Yue period of history (204–111BCE).

See also 
 List of Chinese gardens

References

AAAA-rated tourist attractions
Gardens in Guangdong
2009 establishments in China